666 – Traue keinem, mit dem du schläfst! is a 2002 German film directed by Rainer Matsutani. It is very loosely based on a few elements from the 1808 play Faust by Johann Wolfgang von Goethe.

External links
 

2002 films
2000s fantasy comedy films
German fantasy comedy films
2000s German-language films
Films based on Goethe's Faust
2002 comedy films
2000s German films